Sewall Shurtz (March 17, 1933 – February 1, 2018) was an American fencer. He competed in the individual and team épée and team foil events at the 1956 Summer Olympics.

References

External links
 

1933 births
2018 deaths
American male épée fencers
Olympic fencers of the United States
Fencers at the 1956 Summer Olympics
People from Houston
Pan American Games medalists in fencing
Pan American Games silver medalists for the United States
Fencers at the 1955 Pan American Games
American male foil fencers